Tennessee is a state in the United States of America.

Tennessee may also refer to:

Geography of the United States
 Tennessee, Arkansas, an unincorporated community and census-designated place
 Tennessee, Illinois, a village
 Tennessee River, the largest tributary of the Ohio River
 Tennessee Valley, the drainage valley of the Tennessee River
 Tennessee Pass (Colorado), a high mountain pass in the Rocky Mountains
 Tanasi, sometimes spelled Tennessee, a historic Indian village

People
 Tennessee Claflin (1844–1923), American suffragist and first woman, along with her sister, to open a Wall Street brokerage firm
 Tennessee Ernie Ford (1919–1991), American singer and actor
 Tennessee Thomas (born 1984), British drummer and actress, a founding member of the indie rock band The Like
 Tennessee Williams (1911–1983), American playwright

Ships
 Tennessee (ship), several ships of the name
 SS Tennessee, several ships of the name
 CSS Tennessee, three ships of the Confederate Navy
 USS Tennessee, four ships of the United States Navy
 Tennessee class, several ship classes
 Tennessee-class battleship, a United States Navy class
 Tennessee-class cruiser, a United States Navy class

Music

Songs
 "Tennessee" (Arrested Development song), from the 1992 album 3 Years, 5 Months & 2 Days in the Life Of....
 "Tennessee" (Kevin Rudolf song), from the 2008 album In the City
 "Tennessee" (Bob Sinclar song), from the 2007 album Western Dream
 "Tennessee" (The Wreckers song), from the 2007 album Stand Still, Look Pretty
 "Tennessee", from the 1992 album Generation Terrorists by Manic Street Preachers
 "Tennessee", a 1960 charting single by Jan and Dean
 "Tennessee", a 2012 single by Modern Skirts
 "Tennessee", from the album Low Kii Savage by Kiiara

Other music
 Tennessee Records, a record label
 Tennessee (album), a 2002 album by Lucero

Other meanings
 Tennessee (film), 2008 American drama film directed by Aaron Woodley
 the title character of Tennessee Tuxedo and His Tales, a 1960s American cartoon TV series
 Tennessee Avenue (Washington, D.C.)
 University of Tennessee, Knoxville, Tennessee, United States
Tennessee Volunteers, this school's athletic program

See also